The Much Countdown (also known as the Much Top 30 Countdown, and formerly known as The MuchMusic Top 20 Countdown) is an hour-long musical television program, usually hosted by a VJ, that aired on Canadian music television station MuchMusic from 1996 to 2017. Countdown was one of the longest-running programs that has aired on MuchMusic since the channel's debut. Originally sponsored by Coca-Cola, it was known for the first several years as the Coca-Cola Countdown.

Format
The program aired a playlist of the most well-known songs in the mainstream. The order that the videos were played went from No. 30 to No. 1, although only about 10-12 of those videos were actually played. Most of the videos that went unplayed were older videos that were fading off the charts, or less popular videos. A video that was moving down the chart or was in the same spot as that previous week would in general not get played. Every video debuting on the chart was played. A music video that reached the No. 1 spot usually stayed there for 1–2 weeks.

Number ones

Here is a listing of number ones from 1996 onwards:

1996

1997

1998

1999

2000

2001

2002

2003

2004

2005

2006

2007

2008

2009

2010

2011

2012

2013

2014

2015

2016

2017

References

4. MUCHMUSIC (CANADA) WEEKLY SINGLE CHARTS FOR 1996
http://hitsofalldecades.com/chart_hits/index2.php?option=com_content&do_pdf=1&id=1346

External links
The Top 20 Countdown
MuchMusic Countdown chart and archive on Top40 Charts.com

Much (TV channel) original programming
1990s Canadian music television series
Music chart television shows
Television series by Bell Media
2000s Canadian music television series
2010s Canadian music television series